Agavoideae is a subfamily of monocot flowering plants in the family Asparagaceae, order Asparagales. It has previously been treated as a separate family, Agavaceae. The group includes many well-known desert and dry-zone types, such as the agaves and yuccas (including the Joshua tree). About 640 species are placed in around 23 genera; they are widespread in the tropical, subtropical, and warm temperate regions of the world.

Description and uses
Species may be succulent or not. In general, Agavoideae leaves occur as rosettes at the end of a woody stem, which may range from extremely short to tree-like heights, as in the Joshua tree.  The leaves are parallel-veined, and usually appear long and pointed, often with a hardened spine on the end, and sometimes with additional spines along the margins.

Agave species are used to make tequila, pulque, and mezcal, while others are valued for their fibers.  They are quite popular for xeriscaping, as many have showy flowers.

Systematics

The taxonomy of the group has varied widely. In the APG III system of 2009, adopted here, the Agavoideae are defined very broadly to include the former family Agavaceae along with other formerly separate families such as Anemarrhenaceae, Chlorogalaceae, Hostaceae, Yuccaceae, Anthericaceae, Hesperocallidaceae, and Chlorogalaceae, based on data from molecular systematics. Stevens comments that "The broad concept of Agavoideae [...] may not seem very satisfactory" but that none of the alternatives is better. Sources prior to 2009 will still have Agavaceae (in varying circumscriptions) as a separate family and may contain varying numbers of other families included in the Agavoideae in the APG III system.

Some genera formerly placed in this group (under whatever name) have been separated off; e.g. Dracaena, which superficially resembles some species of Agave, is currently placed in the subfamily Nolinoideae.

Genera
A partial list of the genera included in the Agavoideae is given below. The reference is to the source that places the genus in this subfamily. As noted above, the genera currently included here have varied widely in their limits and assignment to families and subfamilies; some former family placements other than Agavaceae are found in the literature are given below.

See also
 List of foliage plant diseases (Agavaceae)

References

Sources

External links
 Agavaceae in Flora of North America.
 Agavaceae in L. Watson and M.J. Dallwitz (1992 onwards). The families of flowering plants: descriptions, illustrations, identification, information retrieval.
 Die Agaven
 Agavaceae in BoDD – Botanical Dermatology Database
 
 

 
Asparagales subfamilies